Revolutionary Youth Union (officially abbreviated RYU; , Ittihad Shabibat ath-Thawra) is the youth organization of the Arab Socialist Ba'ath Party in Syria. RYU is a member organization of the World Federation of Democratic Youth.

External links
RYU website

References

Anti-Zionist organizations
Arab nationalism in Syria
Ba'athist organizations
Organization of the Ba'ath Party
Organizations with year of establishment missing
Secularism in Syria
Socialism in Syria
Youth organizations based in Syria
Youth wings of political parties